The X-Presidents is an NBC/Saturday Night Live Saturday TV Funhouse cartoon created by Robert Smigel and animated by J. J. Sedelmaier Productions.

Plot
This cartoon features the four former American Presidents who were still alive in 1997 — Gerald Ford, Jimmy Carter, Ronald Reagan, and George H.W. Bush (all of whom were voiced by Jim Morris) — as a superhero team. This recurring sketch debuted on January 11, 1997, and a total of nine installments were produced between 1997 and 2004. The four former leaders were endowed with superpowers when struck by lightning at a celebrity golf tournament. The title is a play on words, both referencing that the members are ex-Presidents, and alluding to the Marvel Comics franchise, X-Men. Their wives are also members of a similar group, The X-First Ladies, with more flamboyant powers.

In the episode "Nixon," Richard Nixon and his dog Checkers are resurrected to aid the group.

The cartoons end with the X-Presidents singing a song that recounts the episode's message. The Ambiguously Gay Duo, another series of shorts created by Robert Smigel and J. J. Sedelmaier, made a special guest appearance in The X-Presidents episode "The Hunt for Osama". The sketch broadly parodies Hanna-Barbera/Filmation cartoons from the 1970s.

Comic adaptation
The cartoon short was adapted to a graphic novel by Random House Books.

References

Television characters introduced in 1997
Animation based on real people
Saturday Night Live sketches
Saturday Night Live in the 1990s
American superhero comedy television series
Cultural depictions of presidents of the United States
Cultural depictions of Gerald Ford
Cultural depictions of Jimmy Carter
Cultural depictions of Ronald Reagan
Cultural depictions of George H. W. Bush
Cultural depictions of Richard Nixon
Cultural depictions of George W. Bush
Cultural depictions of Bill Clinton
Television shows adapted into comics